John Nicholas D.D. was an English academic administrator at the University of Oxford.

Nicholas was elected Warden (head) of New College, Oxford, in 1675, a post he held until 1679.
During his time as Warden of New College, he was also Vice-Chancellor of Oxford University from 1677 until 1679. He was elected warden of Winchester College in 1679, a post he held until his death.

References

Year of birth missing
Year of death missing
Wardens of New College, Oxford
Vice-Chancellors of the University of Oxford
17th-century English people
Wardens of Winchester College